The Stonington Harbor Light is a historic lighthouse built in 1840 and located on the east side of Stonington Harbor in the Borough of Stonington, Connecticut. It is a well-preserved example of a mid-19th century stone lighthouse.  The light was taken out of service in 1889 and now serves as a local history museum.  It was listed on the National Register of Historic Places in 1976.

Description and history
The Stonington Harbor Light is located at the southern end of Stonington Point, marking the eastern side of Stonington Harbor. The light station consists of the tower and keeper's house; both are built out of large granite blocks, and the keeper's house has a wood-framed ell attached. The house is 1½ stories and about  square.

The federal government built a lighthouse on Windmill Point in Stonington Harbor in 1824; it was housed in a small granite lighthouse and was known by the same name.  However, erosion led to its being torn down and its materials reused in the construction of this lighthouse.  The light was originally lit by an oil lamp and broadcast by eight parabolic reflectors.  This technology was already obsolete at the time of the lighthouse's construction, and it was replaced by a sixth-order Fresnel lens in 1856.

In the 1880s, the Stonington Breakwater Light was constructed farther out in the harbor, and the Stonington Harbor Light was decommissioned in 1889. The site is now the home of the Stonington Historical Society which uses the building as The Old Lighthouse Museum.  Holdings in the museum document the area's long and distinguished cultural and nautical history, and exhibits include the 1856 Fresnel lens.

Head keepers

 Neil Martin 1882
 Nahor Jones 1882 – 1886
 Samuel C. Gardiner 1886
 John Ryle 1886 – 1887
 Samuel A. Keeney 1887 – 1903
 Maurice Russell 1903 – 1904
 Adolph Obman 1904 – 1907
 John J. Cook 1907 – 1909
 William Janse 1909
 Adolph Obman 1909 – 1911
 Robert R. Laurier 1911 – 1912
 John H. Paul 1912
 Joseph Meyer 1913
 Charles R. Riley 1915 – 1916
 Edward Grime 1917 – 1919
 George Washington Denton, Jr. 1919
 Edward Murphy 1919 - 1920
 Edward Iten 1921 – 1927
 Edward M. Whitford 1929
 Robert M. Fitton 1930
 Raymond F. Bliven 1930 – 1931
 Martin Luther Sowle 1938 – 1953

See also

 List of lighthouses in Connecticut
 List of lighthouses in the United States
 National Register of Historic Places listings in New London County, Connecticut

References

 Crompton, Samuel Willard.  "The Lighthouse Book."  Barnes and Noble Books, New York, 1999.  .

External links
 
 lighthouse.cc: Stonington Harbor Light Light
 lighthousefriends.com: Inventory of Historic Light Stations
 Old Lighthouse Museum - Stonington Historical Society

Stonington, Connecticut
Lighthouses on the National Register of Historic Places in Connecticut
Long Island Sound
Lighthouses in New London County, Connecticut
Museums in New London County, Connecticut
History museums in Connecticut
Lighthouse museums in the United States
Lighthouses completed in 1824
Lighthouses completed in 1840
Maritime museums in Connecticut
National Register of Historic Places in New London County, Connecticut